Auras is a town and nagar panchayat in Hasanganj tehsil of Unnao district, Uttar Pradesh, India. First officially classified as a town for the 1981 census, Auras is located just north of the Sai River, on the road from Unnao to Sandila. Other roads branch off to Mohan, Newalganj, and Malihabad.

Auras was historically the seat of a pargana and today is the seat of a community development block. Important commodities produced here include wheat flour, rice, and mangoes. As of 2011, the population of Auras is 6,466, in 1,158 households.

History
According to tradition, Auras was founded c. 1400 by Ram Mal, a member of the Ursaha merchant community from Sandila. The Ursahas' trade routes passed through the area, and the site of what is now Auras was covered by forests. Ram Mal cut down the forest and established a village here, which he called "Auras" after his tribe.

Auras was originally part of Lucknow district, but the Auras-Mohan pargana was moved into Unnao district in 1869. It was put into the tehsil previously based at Nawabganj; the headquarters were moved to Mohan at that point and then later moved to Hasanganj.

At the turn of the 20th century, Auras was described as a small village that served as headquarters of the pargana of Auras-Mohan. It had a police station, a road bungalow, and one primary school. There were two markets held weekly, but they were not particularly busy, and the only local products were earthenware and a small amount of jewellery. The population of Auras in 1901 was 1,535 people, including a Muslim population of 96.

Geography
The township is located near the Sai River at the Agra-Lucknow Expressway. The area is covered with evergreen vegetation and is having extremely fertile land for agriculture. The average elevation is 214 mts above sea level and is generally south-east sloping.

Demographics

According to the 2011 census, Auras has a population of 6,466 people, in 1,158 households. The town's sex ratio is 920 females to every 1000 males;  3,368 of Auras's residents are male (52%) and 3,098 are female (48%). The 0-6 age group makes up 14.9% of the town's population; among this group, the sex ratio is 907, which is slightly higher than the district urban average of 903. Members of Scheduled Castes make up 31.26% of the town's population, the highest proportion among towns in Unnao district, while no members of scheduled tribes were recorded. The town's literacy rate was 69.0% (counting only people age 7 and up); literacy was higher among men and boys (77.3%) than among women and girls (60.1%). The corresponding gap of 17.3% was the highest among towns in the district.

In terms of employment, 26.4% of Auras residents were classified as main workers (i.e. people employed for at least 6 months per year) in 2011. Marginal workers (i.e. people employed for less than 6 months per year) made up 6.1%, and the remaining 67.6% were non-workers. Employment status varied according to gender, with 48.6% of men being either main or marginal workers, compared to 14.9% of women.

53.1% of Auras's population lives in slum conditions as of 2011. There are 6 slum areas in Auras: Chamraudha 1st, Chamraudha 2nd, Khambhapar (the largest), Murauwan Tola, Pasiyana, and Thakurahana. These range in size from 85 to 183 households and have between 8 and 22 tap water access points. The number of flush toilets installed in people's homes ranges from 15 to 65. All 6 areas are serviced by open sewers.

Infrastructure
The township is developed in sectors with some being north to Agra-Lucknow Expressway and some being south of it. The commercial and banking settlement is in north and the south has residential lands. The township is developed by LDA and KDA combined. The IT and knowledge park along with heavy machinery industry like Aero-Turbine and Casing Pumps that are set by Haliburton are creating jobs here.

Villages 
Auras CD block has the following 94 villages:

References

Cities and towns in Unnao district